The Hague Judgments Convention, formally the Convention of 2 July 2019 on the Recognition and Enforcement of Foreign Judgments in Civil or Commercial Matters is an international treaty concluded within the Hague Conference on Private International Law. It was concluded in 2019, and will enter into force on 1 September 2023 for the European Union (applicable in all 27 Member States, except Denmark) and Ukraine. The convention governs the recognition of judgements in civil and commercial matters.

History
The Hague Conference started with the "Judgements project" in 1996: the development of a convention regarding jurisdiction and recognition of judgements. Jurisdiction within such a convention would be classified in three categories: bases of jurisdiction which were obligatory, optional or prohibited. As the negotiators were not able to come to a consensus on such a convention, the scope of the work was reduced to jurisdiction and recognition of decisions based on a choice of court agreement between the parties. During the negotiations, parallels were drawn between the New York Convention on arbitral awards: the aim was to create a system of recognition of decisions based on court cases where the court was chosen pursuant to a choice of court agreements, which would create the same level of predictability and enforceability as is the case in arbitral awards in New York Convention states. The efforts led in 2005 to a convention with a narrower scope: the Hague Choice of Court convention focusing on recognition on judgments where jurisdiction had been assumed based on a choice of court agreement between the parties.  After conclusion of the convention new rounds of negotiations led to the conclusion of this convention.

Parties
All states can become parties to the convention: either through signature followed by ratification or acceptance, or by accession. The convention enters into force on 1 September 2023, 1 year after the first 2 states had deposited their instruments of ratification/accession. If a party objects to the ratification or accession of another party, the convention will not enter into force between those parties. Also Regional Economic Integration Organizations (such as the European Union) can become a party if such an organisation governs recognition of judgments. 

The convention was signed on the day of its conclusion by Uruguay, in 2020 by Ukraine, in 2021 by Israel, Costa Rica and Russia, and in 2022 by the United States. The EU acceded in August 2022 with regards to all its members except Denmark and Ukraine ratified on the same day, thus triggering entry into force on 1 September 2023.

See also 
 Convention on the Recognition and Enforcement of Foreign Arbitral Awards
 Hague Choice of Court Convention

References

Treaties concluded in 2019
Treaties not entered into force
Treaties entered into by the European Union
Treaties of Ukraine
Hague Conference on Private International Law conventions